Tierce comes from the Latin word for third and may refer to:

 Tiercé, a commune in France
 Tierce (fencing), a fencing manoeuvre
 Tierce (unit), both an archaic volume unit of measure of goods and the name of the cask of that size
 Tierce, an organ stop, also known as a seventeenth
 Tierce, an archaic term for one-sixtieth of a second
 Tierce, a horse racing bet type also known as a trifecta
 Tierced in heraldry, the dividing of the field into three sections, per pale or per fess

See also 
 Terce, the third liturgical hour